Govert is a  Dutch masculine given name. It is a form of the name Godfried. Other forms include Govaart and Govaert. People with this name include:

Govert-Marinus Augustijn (1871–1963), Dutch potter in the style of the Art Nouveau
Govert Bidloo (1649–1713), Dutch physician, anatomist, poet and playwright
Govert Boyen (born 1977), Belgian football goalkeeper
Govert Brasser (born 1956), Dutch competitive sailor
Nicolaas Govert de Bruijn (1918–2012), Dutch mathematician
Govert Dircksz Camphuysen (1624–1672), Dutch animal and genre painter
Govert Flinck (1615–1660), Dutch painter
Govert Huijser (1931–2014), Dutch Army general
 (1702–1774), Dutch poet and silk merchant
Govert van der Leeuw (1645–1688), Dutch landscape painter
Govert Schilling (born 1956), Dutch astronomer and popular-science writer
Govert Schüller (born 1959), Dutch-American author 
Govert Viergever (born 1989), Dutch rower
Govaert Wendelen (1580–1667), Flemish astronomer

See also 
 Asteroid 10986 Govert, named after Govert Schilling
 Jacqueline Govaert (born 1982), Dutch singer, songwriter, and pianist

References

Dutch masculine given names